David Liebman (born September 4, 1946) is an American saxophonist, flautist and jazz educator. He is known for his innovative lines and use of atonality. He was a frequent collaborator with pianist Richie Beirach.

In June 2010, he received a NEA Jazz Masters lifetime achievement award from the National Endowment for the Arts (NEA).

Biography

Early life and career
David Liebman was born in 1946 into a Jewish family in Brooklyn, New York. As a child in 1949 he contracted polio. He began classical piano lessons at the age of nine and saxophone by twelve. His interest in jazz was sparked by seeing John Coltrane perform live in New York City clubs such as Birdland, the Village Vanguard and the Half Note. Throughout high school and college, Liebman pursued his jazz interest by studying with Joe Allard, Lennie Tristano, and Charles Lloyd. Upon graduation from New York University (with a degree in American history), he began to seriously devote himself to the full-time pursuit of being a jazz artist.

In the early 1970s, after recording with Genya Ravan and Ten Wheel Drive, Liebman took the leading role (as President) in organizing several dozen musicians into a cooperative, Free Life Communication, which became an integral part of the fertile New York loft jazz scene in the early 1970s and was funded by The New York State Council of the Arts and the Space for Innovative Development. After one year spent with Ten Wheel Drive, a rock group with experimental leanings, Liebman secured the saxophone/flute position with the group of John Coltrane's drummer, Elvin Jones. Within two years, Liebman reached the zenith of his apprenticeship period when Miles Davis hired him. These years, 1970–74, were filled with tours and recordings. At the same time, Liebman began exploring his own music, first in the Open Sky Trio with Bob Moses and then with pianist Richie Beirach in the group Lookout Farm. This group recorded for the German-based ECM label as well as A&M Records while touring the U.S., Canada, India, Japan and Europe. Lookout Farm was awarded the number one position in the category "Group Deserving of Wider Recognition"in the 1976 Down Beat's International Critics' Poll. In these years he also played and recorded with Pee Wee Ellis.

In 1977, Liebman toured the world with pianist Chick Corea, followed up the next year by the formation of the David Liebman Quintet with John Scofield, Kenny Kirkland and Terumasa Hino as featured sidemen. After several world tours and recordings by the quintet over three years, he reunited with Richard Beirach. They began performing and recording as a duo, as well as creating the group Quest in 1981. Beginning with bassist George Mraz and drummer Al Foster, the group solidified when Ron McClure and Billy Hart joined in 1984. Through 1991, Quest recorded seven CDs, toured extensively and did many workshops with students worldwide.

1990s to present
After 23 years with the Dave Liebman Group (featuring guitarist Vic Juris), Liebman formed "Expansions" reaching out to the younger generation featuring bassist Tony Marino, pianist Bobby Avey, on reeds Matt Vashlishan and Alex Ritz on drums. Over the past decades, Liebman has often been featured with top European jazz artists such as Joachim Kühn, Daniel Humair, Paolo Fresu, Jon Christensen, Bobo Stenson and in the World View Trio with Austrian drummer Wolfgang Reisenger and French bassist Jean-Paul Celea. His ability to play in so many diverse styles has led to big band and radio orchestra performances with the Brussels Jazz Orchestra, the WDR and NDR in Germany, the Metropole Orchestra of the Netherlands, the new music group Klangforum Wien from Vienna and, most notably, Liebman was the first improviser to perform with the world-famous Ensemble InterContemporain founded by Pierre Boulez in France. On all these occasions, the music is arranged from Liebman's own compositions and improvisations. He has consistently placed among the top finalists in the Down Beat Critic's and Reader's Polls since 1973 in the Soprano Saxophone category and on occasion, flute. Lieb has been featured on several hundred recordings of which he has been the leader or co-leader on over one hundred. Nearly three hundred original compositions have been recorded. His artistic output has ranged from straight-ahead classic jazz to chamber music, from fusion to avant garde, with numerous CDs featuring original arrangements of the music of Thelonious Monk, Miles Davis, Coltrane, Kurt Weill, Alec Wilder, Cole Porter, Antônio Carlos Jobim, Puccini and the Beatles.

Liebman has published material on a variety of subjects including instructional DVDs. He has also published chamber music and over the years has contributed regularly to various periodicals, such as the Saxophone Journal and the International Association of Jazz Educators Journal. He is the author of several milestone books: Self Portrait of a Jazz Artist, Jazz Connections: Miles Davis and David Liebman, A Chromatic Approach to Jazz Harmony and Melody, and Developing a Personal Saxophone Sound. Several of these books have been translated to other languages.

His teaching activities at universities and in clinic settings have taken him literally around the world as a result of his varied musical directions and expertise on several instruments, along with an ability to articulate the intricacies of the jazz language, aesthetic and technique. Over the years, he has regularly received grantees to study with him funded by the NEA (U.S.), the Canadian Arts Council, as well as Arts Councils of numerous European countries. In 1989, he founded the International Association of Schools of Jazz (IASJ), an organization dedicated to networking educators and students from international jazz schools through periodic meetings, exchange programs and newsletters. Liebman presently serves as the Artistic Director of the IASJ. He scored music for the JazzEx Ballet Company in the Netherlands in the early 1990s and Ocean of Light for Katrina and the tsunami tragedies in 2006. Currently, Liebman is the Artist in Residence at the Manhattan School of Music and was visiting Artist at the University of Toronto for year 2014–15.

Liebman and musicologist Lewis Porter teamed up to develop What It Is: The Life of a Jazz Artist, Liebman's biography. Released in March 2012, the book was well received by jazz critics. In 2018, Liebman donated his 1955–2017 archives to Berklee College of Music.

In 1989 he was the Artistic Director of the International Association of Schools of Jazz.  He was an Artist in Residence at the Manhattan School of Music in New York City, and held an annual Saxophone/Chromatic Harmony Master class held at East Stroudsurg University since 1987. He recorded extensively for Double-Time Records during the 1990s.

Personal life 
Liebman is married to oboist and composer Caris Visentin Liebman since 1987. His only daughter, Lydia Liebman, is a noted jazz publicist. Currently, Liebman resides in New York City.

Discography

Dave Liebman is an incredibly prolific artist, with over 250 albums as a leader.

Awards and nominations

ARIA Music Awards
The ARIA Music Awards is an annual awards ceremony that recognises excellence, innovation, and achievement across all genres of Australian music. They commenced in 1987. 

! 
|-
| 2007
| Duologue (with Mike Nock)
| Best Jazz Album
| 
| 
|-

French Jazz Academy

! 
|-
| 1988
| Homage to Coltrane
| Record of the Year
| 
| 
|-

Grammy Awards

! 
|-
| 1998
| "My Favorite Things" from Thank You, John
| Best Jazz Solo
| 
| 
|-
| 2004
| "Sing, Sing, Sing", from Beyond The Line - Dave Liebman Big Band (Omnitone)
| Best Jazz Solo
| 
| 
|-

International Association of Jazz Educators

! 
|-
| 2000
| Dave Liebman
| Hall of Fame
| 
| 
|-

References

External links
 Dave Liebman's web site
 Dave Liebman at AllAboutJazz.com
 Interview with Dave Liebman
 Ted Panken, "In Conversation with Dave Liebman". 
 Carole Dely, "A Conversation with Dave Liebman in Paris", Web Journal Sens Public.
 

1946 births
Living people
ARIA Award winners
Avant-garde jazz musicians
People from Brooklyn
New York University alumni
American jazz soprano saxophonists
American male saxophonists
Jazz soprano saxophonists
American jazz flautists
Lafayette High School (New York City) alumni
Miles Davis
Enja Records artists
Red Records artists
Verve Records artists
Timeless Records artists
ECM Records artists
Chesky Records artists
Household Records artists
People with polio
Jewish American musicians
Jewish jazz musicians
Jazz musicians from New York (state)
21st-century saxophonists
American male jazz musicians
Afro Blue Band members
Quest (band) members
Sunnyside Records artists
American jazz educators
Double-Time Records artists
RareNoiseRecords artists
21st-century flautists